Akoua Romeo Amane (born 1 July 2003) is an Ivorian professional footballer who plays as a midfielder for Häcken.

Career
Raised in Abidjan, Amane began playing football with the Ivorian club ASEC Mimosas at the age of 14 in 2017. He transferred to the Swedish club Häcken on 28 November 2021. He made his professional debut with them in a 2–0 Allsvenskan loss to IFK Göteborg on 17 April 2022.

Playing style
Amane is a dynamic midfielder who works hard, has a good quality of passing and high football IQ. He is inspired by the play of Andres Iniesta.

Honours 
BK Häcken

 Allsvenskan: 2022

References

External links
 

2003 births
Living people
Footballers from Abidjan
Ivorian footballers
BK Häcken players
Allsvenskan players
Association football midfielders
Ivorian expatriate footballers
Nigerian expatriate sportspeople in Sweden
Expatriate footballers in Sweden